Kutrasovka (Qutras) is a rural locality (a village) in Duvansky Selsoviet, Duvansky District, Bashkortostan, Russia. The population was 16 as of 2010. There is 1 street.

Geography 
Kutrasovka is located 35 km northwest of Mesyagutovo (the district's administrative centre) by road. Lemazy is the nearest rural locality.

References 

Rural localities in Duvansky District